James River Day School, or JRDS, is an independent, co-educational, non-sectarian K-8 day school in Lynchburg, Virginia.  JRDS serves academically qualified students in Kindergarten through 8th Grade, regardless of race, color, national origin, ethnic, social, or economic backgrounds.

Mission
"James River Day School cherishes children and challenges them to become scholars, leaders, and citizens for the 21st century, in a community of academic excellence."

Faculty
2015-2016

Total Faculty- 39

Faculty holding advanced degrees- 57%

Curriculum
James River Day School offers instruction in reading and language arts, mathematics, science, history and social studies, visual arts, music, physical education, technology, and world languages for Grades K-8.

Students in Grades 5-8 compete in a variety of sports throughout the year, including: Soccer, Volleyball, Cross Country, Basketball, and Lacrosse.

Farm-to-School Week
During the week of November 8–12, 2010, James River Day School participated in its first Farm-to-School week.  Students ate produce from local farms and on the last day, parents were invited to a farmers' market held at the school.  They were able to see what their children were learning and purchase foods directly from the farmers.  Farms-to-School is a statewide program in Virginia that teaches kids about the importance of eating local foods, and exposing kids to healthy eating earlier in life.

Accreditation
The Virginia Association of Independent Schools has accredited JRDS since 1979.

External links
 James River Day School official website
 VAIS page for James River Day School

Notes

Schools in Lynchburg, Virginia
Private middle schools in Virginia
Private elementary schools in Virginia
Private K–8 schools in the United States